The following is a list of notable events and releases of the year 1941 in Norwegian music.

Events

Deaths

 January
 27 – Iver Holter, musician and band leader, Norwegian Army Band (born 1850).

 December
 3 – Christian Sinding, composer (born 1856).
 24 – Godtfred Pedersen, organist and composer (born 1911).
 31 – Sigwardt Aspestrand, composer (born 1856).

Births

 February
 24 – Kari Onstad, singer and actress.

 July
 31 – Frøydis Ree Wekre, professor of horn and wind chamber music (Norwegian Academy of Music).

 August
 6 – Svein Christiansen, jazz drummer (died 2015).

 October
 2 – Gro Sandvik, classical flautist.

 November
 9 – John Persen, Sami composer (died 2014).

 Unknown date
Carl Høgset, choral conductor.

See also
 1941 in Norway
 Music of Norway

References

 
Norwegian music
Norwegian
Music
1940s in Norwegian music